Pirton railway station, also known as Kempsey railway station, served the village of Pirton, Worcestershire, England, from 1841 to 1844 on the Birmingham and Gloucester Railway.

History 
The station was opened on 15 November 1841 by the Birmingham and Gloucester Railway. It was a short-lived station, closing on 4 November 1844.

References 

Disused railway stations in Worcestershire
Railway stations in Great Britain opened in 1841
Railway stations in Great Britain closed in 1844
1841 establishments in England
1844 disestablishments in England